St. Francis Chapel may refer to:

 St. Francis Chapel (Boston, Massachusetts)
 St. Francis Chapel (Colonie, New York)
 St. Francis Chapel (New Roads, Louisiana), listed on the National Register of Historic Places in Louisiana

See also
 Basilica of San Francesco d'Assisi